Ilsky is an urban locality (an urban-type settlement) in Seversky District of Krasnodar Krai, Russia. Population: 26,359 (2020), 

The village of Ilskaya was founded before all other settlements of the Seversky district. On June 16, 1863, by order of the commander of the troops of the Caucasian Army, the combined squadron of the Seversky Dragoon Regiment began to build a village called Ilskaya, the name is given on the Il River. Already on June 27, 1863, the first batch of Cossack settlers appeared. This date was considered the day of the founding of the village.

References

Urban-type settlements in Krasnodar Krai
Populated places in Seversky District